Tomorrow, with You is a 2017 South Korean television series starring Shin Min-a and Lee Je-hoon. From February 3, 2017 to March 25, 2017 it aired on cable channel tvN every Friday and Saturday at 20:00 (KST).

Synopsis
The story revolves around Yoo So-joon (Lee Je-hoon), a CEO of a real estate company, who has the ability to travel through time via a subway; and his wife, Song Ma-rin (Shin Min-a), who works as an amateur photographer. So-joon foresees his future-self die so he decides to marry Ma-rin in order to avoid that fate. As time passes, he learns to love her selflessly.

Cast

Main

Ma-rin's friends and associates

Myreits - real estate employees and investors

Happiness Construction Employees
Habitat for Humanity knockoff even using the habitat logo

Production
The drama was written by Heo Sung-hye (All About My Wife) and directed by Yoo Je-won (Oh My Ghostess, High School King of Savvy). The first script-reading was held on August 29, 2016 in Sangam-dong, Seoul, South Korea and filming began on September 5, 2016.

Original soundtrack

Part 1

Part 2

Part 3

OST

Charted songs

Ratings
In this table,  represent the lowest ratings and  represent the highest ratings.

This series aired on a cable channel/pay TV which normally has a relatively smaller audience compared to free-to-air
TV/public broadcasters (KBS, SBS, MBC and EBS).

References

External links
  

TVN (South Korean TV channel) television dramas
Korean-language television shows
2017 South Korean television series debuts
South Korean time travel television series
South Korean romantic fantasy television series
Television series by Studio Dragon
South Korean pre-produced television series
2017 South Korean television series endings
Television series by Celltrion Entertainment